Lisa Gretzky (born January 19, 1971) is a politician in Ontario, Canada. She is a New Democratic Party member of the Legislative Assembly of Ontario, who was elected in 2014 and re-elected in 2018. She represents the riding of Windsor West.

Background
She is the cousin-in-law of Wayne Gretzky through her husband Tyler Gretzky.

Politics
Gretzky was elected as a school trustee in 2008 for the Greater Essex County District School Board. She was elected as vice-chair in 2012.

Gretzky ran in the 2014 provincial election as the New Democratic candidate in the riding of Windsor West. She defeated Liberal incumbent Teresa Piruzza by 2,098 votes.

She was the party's critic for Community Safety and Correctional Services, but as of March 23, 2015, she now resides as the party's critic for Education.

Election results

References

External links

1971 births
Living people
Lisa
Canadian people of Belarusian descent
Ontario New Democratic Party MPPs
Ontario school board trustees
Politicians from Windsor, Ontario
Women MPPs in Ontario
21st-century Canadian politicians
21st-century Canadian women politicians